Chief Olufela Obafunmilayo "Fela" Sowande MBE (29 May 1905 – 13 March 1987) was a Nigerian musician and composer.
Considered the father of modern Nigerian art music, Sowande is perhaps the most internationally known African composer of works in the European "classical" idiom.

Early life

Sowande  was born in Abeokuta, near Lagos, the son of Emmanuel Sowande, a priest and pioneer of Nigerian church music. 
As a child he sang in the Choir of the Cathedral Church of Christ. 
He studied at the C.M.S. Grammar School and at King's College, Lagos.
The influence of his father and Dr T. K. Ekundayo Phillips (composer, organist and choirmaster) was an important factor in his early years. At that time, Sowande was a chorister and was introduced to new Yoruba works being introduced into the churches. During that period, he studied organ under Phillips (including works by Bach and European classical masters), and earned the Fellowship Diploma (FRCO) from the Royal College of Organists. At that time, he was also a bandleader, playing jazz and popular highlife music. All of these had considerable influence on his work.

London
In 1934, Sowande went to London to study European classical and popular music. In 1936, he was solo pianist in a performance of George Gershwin's Rhapsody in Blue. He also played as part of a pianist duo with Fats Waller, was theatre organist for the BBC, Choirmaster at Kingsway Hall and pianist in the 1936 production of Blackbirds. In 1939, he played the organ on recordings by popular singers Adelaide Hall and Vera Lynn. Later, he studied organ privately under Edmund Rubbra, George Oldroyd, and George Cunningham and became a Fellow of the Royal College of Organists in 1943, winning the Limpus, Harding and Read Prizes.

He also won several prizes and obtained a Bachelor of Music degree at the University of London and became a Fellow of Trinity College of Music. He also worked as musical advisor for the Colonial Film Unit of the Ministry of Information during the Second World War, providing background music for educational films.

From 1945, he was a renowned organist and choirmaster at the West London Mission of the Methodist Church until 1952, and a considerable amount of organ music dates from this period. These are based on Nigerian melodies that gave a special appeal to the Black members of his congregation in the early years of migration from the African continent and the Caribbean. During this time, he also became known as a dance pianist, bandleader, and Hammond organist, playing popular tunes of the day.

Western and African ideas prevail in his music, which included organ works such as Yorùbá Lament, Obangiji, Kyrie, Gloria, Jesu Olugbala, and Oba Aba Ke Pe. Most of these show a strong influence from Anglican Church music, combined with Yoruba pentatonic melodies.

His orchestral works include Six Sketches for Full Orchestra, A Folk Symphony, and African Suite for string orchestra, and show African rhythmic and harmonic characteristics. The final movement of African Suite became known to Canadian audiences as the theme of the popular CBC music programme Gilmour's Albums, and is now a Canadian orchestral standard. He also wrote a significant amount of secular and sacred choral music, mainly a cappella. Some of these works were composed during his period with the BBC Africa Service. He went back to Nigeria to scholarly work with the Nigerian Broadcasting Corporation and later the University of Ibadan. He was appointed MBE in the 1955 Queen's Birthday Honours for his work in the Nigerian Broadcasting Service. In 1968 he moved to Howard University in Washington, D.C., then the University of Pittsburgh.

Later life
In the last years of his life Sowande taught in the Department of Pan-African Studies at Kent State University, and lived in nearby Ravenna, Ohio with his wife, Eleanor McKinney, who was one of the founders of Pacifica Radio. He died in Ravenna and is buried in Randolph Township, Ohio.

In addition to his position as a professor, Sowande also held the chieftaincy title of the Bariyo of Lagos. There is currently a move to set up a centre to research and promote his works, as many remain unpublished or are out of print.

Selected compositions

Organ
 1945 – Ka Mura, Chappell, London
 1952 – Pastourelle (for organ), Chappell, London
 1955 – Jesu Olugbala, Chappell, London
 1955 – Joshua Fit de Battle of Jericho, Chappell, London
 1955 – Kyrie, Chappell, London
 1955 – Obangiji, Chappell, London
 1955 – Yorùbá Lament, Chappell, London
 1958 – Oyigiyigi, Ricordi, New York
 1958 – Gloria, Ricordi, New York
 1958 – 'Prayer, Ricordi, New York
 1959 – Responses in 'A’ KÕa Mo Rokoso Oba Aba Ke Pe Go Down MosesChoral
 "The Wedding Day" for S.S.A. with piano, 1957, RDH
 "Sometimes I Feel Like a Motherless Child" for S.A.T.B. a cappella, 1955, Chappell, London
 "My Way's Cloudy" for S.A.T.B. with piano, 1955, Chappell, London
 "De Ol' Ark's a-Moverin" for S.A.T.B.B. a cappella with tenor solo, 1955, Chappell, London
 "Same Train" for S.A.T.B.B. a cappella, 1955, Chappell, London
 "Roll de Ol' Chariot" for S.A.T.B.B. with piano and rhythm combo, 1955, Chappell, London
 Steal Away for S.A.T.B.B. a cappella, 1955, Chappell, London
 "All I d"o for S.A.T.B.B. with piano and rhythm combo, 1961, Ricordi, New York
 "Goin' to Set Down" for S.A.T.B. a cappella with soprano solo, 1961, Ricordi, New York
 "Couldn't Hear Nobody Pray" for S.A.T.B. a cappella with soprano solo, 1958, Ricordi, New York
 "De Angels Are Watchin'" for S.A.T.B. a cappella with soprano and tenor solo, 1958, Ricordi, New York
 "Nobody Knows de Trouble I See" for S.A.TB. a cappella, 1958, Ricordi, New York
 "Wheel, Oh Wheel" for S.A.T.B. a cappella, 1961, Ricordi, New York
 "Wid a Sword in Ma Hand" for S.A.T.B.B. a cappella, 1958, Ricordi, New York
 "Sit Down Servant" for T.T.B.B. a cappella and tenor solo, 1961, Ricordi, New York
 "Out of Zion" for S.A.T.B. with organ, 1955
 "St. Jude's Response" for S.A.T.B. with organ
 "Oh Render Thanks" (hymn-anthem) for S.A.T.B. with organ, 1960
 Nigerian National Anthem (an arrangement) for S.A.T.B. with organ, 1960

Solo songs
 Three Songs of Contemplation for tenor and piano, 1950, Chappell, London
 Because of You for voice and piano, 1950, Chappell, London
 Three Yoruba Songs for voice and piano, 1954, Ibadan

Orchestral
 Four Sketches for full orchestra, 1953
 African Suite for string orchestra, 1955, Chappell, London
 Folk Symphony for full orchestra, 1960

Books
 (1964). Ifa: Guide, Counsellor, and Friend of Our Forefathers. Ibadan.
 (1966). The Mind of a Nation: The Yoruba Child. Ibadan: Ibadan University.
 (1968). Come Now Nigeria, Part 1: Nationalism and essays on relevant subjects. Ibadan: Sketch Pub. Co.; sole distributors: Nigerian Book Suppliers. (All the material presented in this book first appeared in the form of articles in the pages of the Daily Sketch, Ibadan.)
 (1975). The Africanization of Black Studies. Kent, Ohio: Kent State University Institute for African American Affairs. African American Affairs Monograph Series, v. 2, no. 1.

Articles 
 (1971). "Black Folklore", Black Lines: A Journal of Black Studies (special issue: Black Folklore), v. 2, no. 1 (Fall 1971), pp. 5–21.

References

Further reading
Cole, Bill (1976). John Coltrane. Schirmer Books. . Reprinted by Da Capo Press (1993, 2001). .
Sadoh, Godwin (2007). The Organ Works of Fela Sowande: Cultural Perspectives. iUniverse. .

External links
A more detailed account of his life
Another Fela Sowande bio
Val Wilmer (on Sowande's relationship with pianist Rita Cann), "Rita Cann – Musical talent lead her to become one of the first visible black women in London society" (obituary), The Guardian'', 10 May 2001.
 The Papers of Fela Sowande at Dartmouth College Library

1905 births
1987 deaths
20th-century classical composers
20th-century Nigerian musicians
Alumni of the University of London
American people of Yoruba descent
Burials in Ohio
CMS Grammar School, Lagos alumni
Fellows of the Royal College of Organists
Howard University faculty
Kent State University faculty
King's College, Lagos alumni
Male classical composers
Musicians from Abeokuta
Nigerian academics
Nigerian classical composers
Nigerian emigrants to the United States
Nigerian expatriates in the United Kingdom
Nigerian male musicians
Nigerian people of World War II
People from Ravenna, Ohio
Theatre organists
University of Pittsburgh faculty
Yoruba academics
Yoruba-language writers
Yoruba musicians
20th-century organists
20th-century male musicians
Academics of Trinity College of Music